Mosalikanti Thirumala Rao (Telugu: మొసలికంటి తిరుమలరావు) (29 January 1901 –  1970) was an Indian freedom activist and Parliament member.

Life Sketch
He was born to Shri Bayanna Pantulu in Pithapuram, East Godavari district, Andhra Pradesh, India.

He joined Indian Independence movement on the call of Mahatma Gandhi and was jailed many times as a result of his participation.

He was elected president of District of East Godavari Congress Committee twice. He was Member of Central Legislative Assembly, 1937–40; Council of States. 1945–47; Constituent Assembly of India 1948–50 and Provisional Parliament, 1950–52. He was elected thrice from the Kakinada constituency for 2nd Lok Sabha, 3rd Lok Sabha and 4th Lok Sabha as member of Indian National Congress and served the ministry.

He was Deputy Minister of Food and Agriculture, Government of India between 1950–52. He was Lieutenant Governor of Vindhya Pradesh in 1956.

He has translated the God Speaks by Avatar Meher Baba into Telugu language.

References

 Thirumala Rao Mosalikanti, Luminaries of 20th Century, Potti Sreeramulu Telugu University, Hyderabad, 2005.

External links
 Biodata of Mosalikanti Thirumala Rao at Lok Sabha website.

Telugu politicians
India MPs 1957–1962
India MPs 1962–1967
India MPs 1967–1970
Indian independence activists from Andhra Pradesh
1901 births
1970 deaths
Lok Sabha members from Andhra Pradesh
Indian National Congress politicians from Andhra Pradesh
People from East Godavari district